Austria sent a delegation to compete at the 1964 Summer Paralympics in Tokyo, Japan.  Its athletes finished twelfth in the overall medal count.

Medalists

See also 
 Austria at the Paralympics
 Austria at the 1964 Summer Olympics

References 

Nations at the 1964 Summer Paralympics
1964
Summer Paralympics